Zodarion fuscum is a spider species found in Britain, France, Spain and Portugal.

See also 
 List of Zodariidae species

References

External links 

fuscum
Spiders of Europe
Spiders described in 1870